Dr T. Selva is an author, columnist, radio and television personality on Vastu Shastra and ancient secrets. He is an international speaker on the subject and has presented 525 talks in 17 countries, attracting hundreds of people to each session. Through his teachings on ancient philosophies, he is said to have brought changes and hope into the lives of many people.

He holds a Master of Arts (Communication Management) from the University of South Australia and received his Honorary Doctor of Oriental Learning (PhD) from the Indian Institute of Oriental Heritage. He was conferred the prestigious titles Vasthu Padma Bhushan, Vasthu Samrat and Vasthu Gaurav from the Kolkata-based Asian Astrologers Congress for his outstanding work and excellence in promoting ancient Indian sciences and secrets worldwide for free. The Malaysian Astrological Society has also awarded him with Vasthu Ratnakara in recognition of his meritorious services, research, development, propagation and modernisation of Vasthu, astrology and Tantra sciences.

Dr. Selva has authored five books on ancient Indian sciences. He studied Vastu Sastra under the 7th Generation Vasthu Sastra Master Yuvaraj Sowma from Chennai and became his first disciple in 2000. Selva is the first person outside India to write and talk extensively on Vasthu Sastra. He is the pioneer in the world to provide daily Vasthu Sastra tips via SMS to mobile phone users in Malaysia.

Early life 
Born on 30 July 1959 in Port Klang T. Selva is the youngest in a family of eight. His late father Thirunavakkarasu was a civil servant and his mother Rajaletchumi became the sole breadwinner when Selva's father died when he was 12 years old. Selva's father had a deep understanding of the occult sciences and interest in astrology and palmistry, which Selva believes to have inherited. Selva continues to have great admiration for his late grandfather Govindasamy, inspiring him to live his life as a respected and credible person with integrity.

Selva received his early education at La Salle School Klang and from young he was active in writing. He studied journalism at the London School of Journalism and holds a Master of Arts (Communication Management) from the University of South Australia. He also studied Public Relations and holds a Diploma in Public Relations from the Malaysian Institute of Public Relations.

Career

Journalism 
T. Selva's first article was published in the New Straits Times when he was just 14 years old. Since then, he started contributing articles in English and Malay to several newspapers (New Straits Times, The Star, Straits Echo, Watan) and magazines (Gema RTM, Sinar Zaman) during his teenage years. He joined The Star in February 1980 and after a short stint at the headquarters, was sent to become the newspaper's staff correspondent in Klang. He served the Klang bureau for six years and among his outstanding stories were those related to the port and maritime industry.

During his stint there, he also covered the official functions and activities of His Highness the late Sultan of Selangor, Sultan Salahuddin Abdul Aziz Shah. He was awarded the Pingat Jasa Kebaktian (PJK) from the Sultan for his outstanding work and writings on the state. Selva wrote a moving piece on the Sultan (who was the King when he died on 21 November 2001), published in The Star on 22 November 2001.

Selva was sent to Kuching in 1986, to establish The Star's bureau there. He served as the corresponded for Sarawak for two years and also covered news in Brunei. He also served in the Ipoh bureau for a brief stint before returning to the newspaper's headquarters in 1990 to take up the position of Assistant Editor of its Metro section. He introduced and became the editor of the paper's Maritime Section for nine years. Selva then moved on to establish the Metro supplement in the paper's Sunday edition, The Sunday Star. After two years as the Metro Section's editor, he became the paper's Senior News Editor, and in 2010 he was promoted to Chief News Editor. He is currently the Senior Consulting Editor.

He also wrote a popular Vasthu Sastra column in The Sunday Star from 2001, and owing to the popularity of his writing on ancient knowledge, his column was widened and renamed Ancient Secrets in June 2011. He also provides tips on Vasthu Sastra and ancient secrets via SMS to mobile phone users in Malaysia via The Star. His column also appears in the Indus Age newspaper in Australia. His bestseller Vasthu Sastra Guide book has been translated from English to Japanese, French, Tamil, Hindi and Fasi languages. His other books are Journey With Amma, Secrets of Mole Reading, 101 Tips on Indian Feng Shui and Vasthu Sastra for World Peace.

References

External links 
 T. Selva's profile on VasthuSastra.com
 T. Selva's Vasthu tips via SMS

1959 births
Living people
Alumni of the London School of Journalism
University of South Australia alumni
People from Selangor
Hindu philosophers and theologians
Malaysian writers
Malaysian television personalities
Malaysian people of Indian descent
Malaysian Hindus